100 is a play produced by the theatrical company "TheImaginaryBody" for the Edinburgh Festival Fringe. It first appeared at the 2002 festival, where it won a Fringe First Award for 'innovation in theatre and outstanding new production'. Since then, it has played at a variety of venues around the world, including the Soho Theatre in London and the du Maurier Theatre in Toronto.

Plot summary
The play centers on the afterlives of four characters who, finding themselves in a mysterious 'Void', are informed by the equally enigmatic Guide that they must choose one memory from their lives in which to spend eternity. The remainder of the play follows their individual memories and searches for self-knowledge. Although heralded at the time as new, the premise of the play is in fact quite similar to that of Japanese director Hirokazu Koreeda's 1998 film 'After Life', in which the concept was less stylized. The deaths of the characters themselves, alongside their memories, are explored throughout the play physically by the cast. Alex and Nia are told to have died from smoke inhalation, by a fire while they slept. Ketu committed suicide, unable to live with the knowledge that only he was living with the truth. It is also confirmed, while not explicitly mentioned what illness within the play, that the character of Sophie suffers from an STD given to her by Mr Gray, the cause of her death, in an interview with writer Neil Monaghan in March 2003.

Original Cast
Jahmiy lamey - Ketu
Hollie Freeman/Louise Dilley - Sophie
Kyle Biggs - Alex
Ashleigh Boyce/ Emily Armstrong  - Nia
Nemiya Berlin/James Cox   - Guide
---Producer - Claire Wright-

Secondary Cast
Matthew Wilson       - Ketu
Bethany Jackson       - Sophie
Huw Smallwood       - Phil
George Hardcastle       - Alex
Ruby Barker       - Nia
Joel Britton       - Guide

References

External links
Official Play Website

Scottish plays
2002 plays